Brigitte Scheijbal is an Austrian former ice dancer. Competing with Walter Leschetizky, she became a three-time Austrian national champion. They competed at two European and two World Championships in the 1970s. The duo belonged to Wiener Eislauf-Verein.

Earlier in her career, Scheijbal had a partnership with Kurt Jaschek. They skated together at two World Championships.

Competitive highlights

With Leschetizky

With Jaschek

References 

20th-century births
Austrian female ice dancers
Living people
Year of birth missing (living people)